Bryte (formerly, Riverbank) is a former town in Yolo County, California, now forming part of West Sacramento. It is located just south of the Sacramento River in the eastern portion of the county. Bryte's ZIP Code is 95605 and is in area codes 916 and 279. It lies at an elevation of 23 feet (7 m).

Bryte was named after Mike Bryte, an early dairy farmer on whose land the town arose. Bryte came to California in 1849 to try his hand at gold mining. Although he did not make a fortune in gold, he bought a dairy farm in 1853 which was very successful. When the California Steam Navigation Company came to Washington, Bryte used the steamships to carry his dairy products to regional markets. Profits from this allowed Bryte to expand his holdings. By 1879, he owned 1,500 acres of land, raised 150 cows and 100 young stock, and farmed 2,500 acres in Sacramento County. Mike Bryte's status in the community was marked by his election to the Yolo County Board of Supervisors and later as sheriff. During the 20th century, Mike Bryte's property was subdivided and became known as the community of Bryte. 

A post office opened in Bryte in 1915.

References
Notes

Sources

External links
History of West Sacramento

West Sacramento, California
Former populated places in California
Populated places on the Sacramento River
Populated places in Yolo County, California
History of Yolo County, California